The Kremlin Armoury, is one of the oldest museums of Moscow, located in the Moscow Kremlin, now a part of Moscow Kremlin Museums.

The Kremlin Armoury originated as the royal arsenal in 1508. Until the transfer of the court to St Petersburg, the Armoury was in charge of producing, purchasing and storing weapons, jewelry and various household articles of the tsars, and valuables stolen from occupied countries. The finest Muscovite gunsmiths (the Vyatkin brothers), jewelers (Gavrila Ovdokimov), and painters (Simon Ushakov) used to work there. In 1640 and 1683, they opened the iconography and pictorial studios, where the lessons on painting and handicrafts could be given. In 1700, the Armoury was enriched with the treasures of the Golden and Silver chambers of the Russian tsars.

History
In 1711, Peter the Great had the majority of masters transferred to his new capital, St Petersburg. 15 years later, the Armoury was merged with the Fiscal Yard (the oldest depository of the royal treasures), Stables Treasury (in charge of storing harnesses and carriages) and the Master Chamber (in charge of sewing clothes and bedclothes for the tsars). After that, the Armoury was renamed into the Arms and Master Chamber. Alexander I of Russia nominated the Armoury as the first public museum in Moscow in 1806, but the collections were not opened to the public until seven years later.

Ten of the 44 surviving Fabergé imperial Easter eggs are displayed at the Armory Museum. After the Russian Revolution, the imperial family's palaces were ransacked and their treasures moved to the Kremlin Armoury on order of Vladimir Lenin.

Russian Diamond Fund
Beside the Armoury Chamber/Museum, the Kremlin Armoury is also currently home to the Russian Diamond Fund. It holds unique collections of the Russian, Western European and Eastern applied arts spanning the period from the 5th to the 20th centuries.

Notes

References

External links
 Kremlin Museums: The Armoury Chamber
 The Armory Chamber – Travel Guide

Buildings and structures in Moscow
Museums in Moscow
Russia
Military and war museums in Russia
Moscow Kremlin
Armories (military)
Russian Revival architecture
Jewellery museums
Decorative arts museums in Russia
Cultural heritage monuments of federal significance in Moscow